Keyword stuffing is a search engine optimization (SEO) technique, considered webspam or spamdexing, in which keywords are loaded into a web page's meta tags, visible content, or backlink anchor text in an attempt to gain an unfair rank advantage in search engines. Keyword stuffing may lead to a website being temporarily or permanently banned or penalized on major search engines. The repetition of words in meta tags may explain why many search engines no longer use these tags. Nowadays, search engines focus more on the content that is unique, comprehensive, relevant, and helpful that overall makes the quality better which makes keyword stuffing useless, but it is still practiced by many webmasters.

Many major search engines have implemented algorithms that recognize keyword stuffing, and reduce or eliminate any unfair search advantage that the tactic may have been intended to gain, and oftentimes they will also penalize, demote or remove websites from their indexes that implement keyword stuffing.

Changes and algorithms specifically intended to penalize or ban sites using keyword stuffing include the Google Florida update (November 2003) Google Panda (February 2011) Google Hummingbird (August 2013) and Bing's September 2014 update.

History
Keyword stuffing had been used in the past to obtain top search engine rankings and visibility for particular phrases. This method is outdated and adds no value to rankings today. In particular, Google no longer gives good rankings to pages employing this technique.

Hiding text from the visitor is done in many different ways. Text colored to blend with the background, CSS z-index positioning to place text underneath an image — and therefore out of view of the visitor — and CSS absolute positioning to have the text positioned far from the page center are all common techniques. By 2005, many invisible text techniques were easily detected by major search engines.

"Noscript" tags are another way to place hidden content within a page. While they are a valid optimization method for displaying an alternative representation of scripted content, they may be abused, since search engines may index content that is invisible to most visitors.

Sometimes inserted text includes words that are frequently searched (such as "sex"), even if those terms bear little connection to the content of a page, in order to attract traffic to advert-driven pages.

In the past, keyword stuffing was considered to be either a white hat or a black hat tactic, depending on the context of the technique, and the opinion of the person judging it. While a great deal of keyword stuffing was employed to aid in spamdexing, which is of little benefit to the user, keyword stuffing in certain circumstances was not intended to skew results in a deceptive manner. Whether the term carries a pejorative or neutral connotation is dependent on whether the practice is used to pollute the results with pages of little relevance, or to direct traffic to a page of relevance that would have otherwise been de-emphasized due to the search engine's inability to interpret and understand related ideas. This is no longer the case.  Search engines now employ themed, related keyword techniques to interpret the intent of the content on a page.

In online journalism
Headlines in online news sites are increasingly packed with just the search-friendly keywords that identify the story. Traditional reporters and editors frown on the practice, but it is effective in optimizing news stories for search.

See also
Cloaking
Content farm
Doorway pages
Hidden text
Link farming
Scraper site
Spamdexing
Trademark stuffing
White fonting

References

External links
Google Guidelines
Yahoo! Guidelines
Live Search (MSN Search) Guidelines

Spamming
Black hat search engine optimization